Annerose Fiedler, née Krumpholz (born 5 September 1951 in Lützensömmern) is a retired East German hurdler.

She competed for the sports club SC Turbine Erfurt during her active career.

Achievements

References

1951 births
Living people
People from Unstrut-Hainich-Kreis
East German female hurdlers
Sportspeople from Thuringia
Olympic athletes of East Germany
Athletes (track and field) at the 1972 Summer Olympics
European Athletics Championships medalists
Universiade medalists in athletics (track and field)
Universiade silver medalists for East Germany
Medalists at the 1973 Summer Universiade